The Bowen-Jones Baronetcy, of St Mary's Court in the Borough of Shrewsbury, was a title in the Baronetage of the United Kingdom. It was created on 4 July 1911 for John Bowen-Jones, a deputy lieutenant and justice of the peace for Shropshire. Born John Jones, he assumed the additional surname of Bowen in 1911. The title became extinct on his death in 1925.

Bowen-Jones baronets, of St Mary's Court (1911)
Sir John Bowen Bowen-Jones, 1st Baronet (1840–1925)

References

Extinct baronetcies in the Baronetage of the United Kingdom